Sébastien Charpentier may refer to:

 Sébastien Charpentier (motorcycle racer) (born 1973), French motorcycle road racer
 Sébastien Charpentier (ice hockey) (born 1977), Canadian ice hockey goaltender